The 2010 S-Pulse season was S-Pulse's nineteenth season in existence and their eighteenth season in the J1 League. The club also competed in the Emperor's Cup and the J.League Cup. The team finished the season sixth in the league.

Competitions

Player statistics

Other pages
 J. League official site

Shimizu S-Pulse
Shimizu S-Pulse seasons